Richie Alan (born Richard Alan Galichon; 1968 in NY) is an independent studio drummer.  He grew up in Valley Stream, New York and attended Valley Stream Central High School. He earned a Bachelor of Arts in Computer Science from Queens College, City University of New York and pursued a Master of Business Administration degree specializing in Information Systems Management at The George Washington University School of Business.  He later founded a successful Information Technology Consulting Services corporation.

During his earlier years, Richie Alan took weekly lessons at the Downs School of Music for 4 years. While studying there, Richie Alan emerged as a three-time gold medalist and one-time silver medalist in the Long Island Drum Teachers Association.  Years later, he expanded his studies with legendary jazz drummer Joe Morello (Dave Brubeck Quartet) and classic-rock drummer Simon Kirke (Bad Company).

Mostly known in the underground New York music scene, Richie Alan's drumming achieved a modest following, garnering praise from well-established drummers including Tommy Aldridge (Ozzy Osbourne, Whitesnake), Bill Bruford (Yes, King Crimson), and Jonathan Mover (Fuel, Everlast, Alice Cooper)

Legendary guitarist Les Paul presented Richie Alan with an autographed custom Gibson Les Paul guitar at a Beacons in Jazz award gala in 2003.

Richie Alan performed on drums and percussion with John Ford of the Strawbs and is on Ford's 2014 "No Talkin'" album. Richie Alan has also performed with Ian Lloyd (Stories), Simon Kirke (Bad Company) and Southern Rock tribute band Southern Exposure.  Richie Alan has also performed on dozens of independent albums as an "Internet Session Drummer".

He cites the following as his influences: John Bonham, Neil Peart, Steve Smith, Dave Weckl and Lee Kerslake.

Richie Alan plays Saluda cymbals live and in the studio.

References

External links
 RICHIE ALAN, Session Drummer

1968 births
Living people
American rock drummers
American jazz drummers
American rock musicians
Valley Stream Central High School alumni
Queens College, City University of New York alumni
George Washington University School of Business alumni
20th-century American drummers
American male drummers
American male jazz musicians
20th-century American male musicians